Qarah Yasar-e Bala (also Romanized as Qarah Yasar-e Bālā and Qareh Yasar-e Bālā) is a village in Zavkuh Rural District, Pishkamar District, Kalaleh County, Golestan Province, Iran. At the 2006 census, its population was 188, in 40 families.

References 

Populated places in Kalaleh County